Clovis Alberto de Oliveira (born 22 October 1954) is a Brazilian football manager.

Coaching career
Having managed the Trinidad and Tobago and Tanzania national football teams, Clovis de Oliveira was managing in Saudi Arabia when he was offered the chance to take the Jamaica U17 to the 1999 FIFA U-17 World Championship by friend and compatriot, René Simões. He went on to manage the Jamaica national football team for the following two years.

Following his departure in 2001, he went on to work as assistant coach to René Simões with the Brazil women's national football team at the 2004 Summer Olympics.

In 2009, he was appointed manager of America-RJ, and went on to record 21 wins in 31 games. He managed Friburguense before returning to America-RJ in 2016.

He has also managed in the United Arab Emirates and Oman.

Managerial statistics

References

1954 births
Living people
People from Duque de Caxias, Rio de Janeiro
Sportspeople from Rio de Janeiro (state)
Brazilian football managers
Trinidad and Tobago national football team managers
Tanzania national football team managers
Jamaica national football team managers
Friburguense Atlético Clube managers
Brazilian expatriate football managers
Brazilian expatriate sportspeople in Trinidad and Tobago
Expatriate football managers in Trinidad and Tobago
Brazilian expatriate sportspeople in Tanzania
Expatriate football managers in Tanzania
Brazilian expatriate sportspeople in Saudi Arabia
Expatriate football managers in Saudi Arabia
Brazilian expatriate sportspeople in Jamaica
Expatriate football managers in Jamaica
Brazilian expatriate sportspeople in Qatar
Expatriate football managers in Qatar
Brazilian expatriate sportspeople in the United Arab Emirates
Expatriate football managers in the United Arab Emirates
Brazilian expatriate sportspeople in Oman
Expatriate football managers in Oman